The CopperWynd Pro Women's Challenge was a tournament for professional female tennis players played on outdoor hardcourts. The event was classified as a $50,000 ITF Women's Circuit tournament and was held in Scottsdale, U.S., 2015 and 2016.

Past finals

Singles

Doubles

External links
 ITF search
 Official website

ITF Women's World Tennis Tour
Hard court tennis tournaments in the United States
Sports competitions in Scottsdale, Arizona
Recurring sporting events established in 2015
Tennis tournaments in Arizona